Williams is a 2017 British feature documentary film that tells the story of the Williams Formula 1 team, from its inception to the present day. The film was produced by BBC Films, Minnow Films and Curzon Artificial Eye, and is being distributed in cinemas across the UK and Ireland by Curzon Artificial Eye from 4 August 2017.

Directed by Morgan Matthews, the documentary focuses on the life, career and family of Sir Frank Williams, the founder of the Williams team.

External links
 

2017 films
2017 documentary films
2010s sports films
British auto racing films
Documentary films about auto racing
Documentary films about sportspeople
Formula One mass media
Documentary films about families
2010s English-language films
British sports documentary films
2010s British films